The Jagers te Paard Battalion is a Reconnaissance battalion in the Motorized Brigade of the Belgian Armed Forces. Jagers te Paard translates into English as Hunters on Horses, the lineage of the current battalion came into existence in 2011 with the linking of the 1st Jagers te Paard with 2nd Jagers te Paard/4th Chasseurs à Cheval when re-rolled in to its current role as an Intelligence, Surveillance, Reconnaissance & Target Acquisition (ISTAR) battalion supporting the Motorized Brigade:

Organisation 
Jagers te Paard Battalion
 HQ staff and Support Squadron
 A Reconnaissance Squadron
 B Reconnaissance Squadron
 C Radar and Ground Sensors Squadron  
 D Training Squadron

A and B Squadron's each have a Voltigeurs platoon for dismounted reconnaissance, C Squadron can be integrated/interface with 80th UAV Squadron, employing their sensor and analysis capabilities  from the Air Component

References 

2011 establishments in Belgium
Battalions of Belgium
Military units and formations established in 2011